V. R. Kota (Veera Raaghavuni Kota) is one of the major villages in Lingasamudram Mandal Prakasam District on the East Coast of India in the state of Andhra Pradesh, in a river valley. It is one of the most forwarded villages in the Lingasamudram mandal.

The village people have good discipline and stand on one word.

Famous temple is : 500 years old Sivalayam near a River tributory.

In the month of October, 2021 the Villagers celebrated the function of "GRAMA GARBHA PUNA STHAPITHAM" which is named in normal language as "GRAMA BODDU RAAYI POOJA".

All the people settled in all over the world came and made the function a grand success.

The village was led by various Gentlemen and Great Farmers and Land Lords viz., Singam Naidu, Patibandla Families and Vankayalapati Families.

All villagers behave in respectful manner and receive visitors to the village in a nice way.

The connected Railway station is "ONGOLE" a Major Railway station on the Chennai-Howrah Railway Route.

References 

Villages in Prakasam district